Louise Alexander (born April 4, 1960) is an American politician who has served in the Alabama House of Representatives from the 56th district since 2014.

References

External links

1960 births
Living people
Democratic Party members of the Alabama House of Representatives
21st-century American politicians
21st-century American women politicians
People from Bessemer, Alabama
African-American state legislators in Alabama
Women state legislators in Alabama